The Lungu people (also known as Rungu or Tabwa) are a Bantu ethnic group living primarily on the southwestern shores of Lake Tanganyika in Rukwa Region's Kalambo District  and on the Marungu massif in eastern Democratic Republic of the Congo, and in southwestern Tanzania and northeastern Zambia. They speak dialects of the Mambwe-Lungu language, a Bantu language.

Lungu people comprise several clans and many subclans based on matrilineal descent, some with their own dialects, which are depicted as separate tribes on older ethnographic maps. PeopleGroups.org reports a population of 851,359 Lungu in the Democratic Republic of the Congo in 1999. In 1987 the Rungu population in Tanzania was estimated to number 34,000. The number of Rungu in Zambia has not been independently estimated, though the combined number of Mambwe and Rungu in Zambia was estimated to be 262,800 in 1993 .

References

 Tabwa, Encyclopædia Britannica
 University of Iowa article

Ethnic groups in the Democratic Republic of the Congo
Ethnic groups in Tanzania
Ethnic groups in Zambia
Democratic Republic of the Congo–Zambia relations